South Jersey Industries (NYSE: SJI) is a publicly held energy services holding company for a natural gas utility and other, non-regulated companies. SJI's family of companies include:
South Jersey Gas - delivering natural gas to more than 380,000 residential, commercial and industrial customers in New Jersey’s seven southern counties.
South Jersey Energy Solutions - As the parent company for South Jersey Industries’ non-regulated businesses, SJES provides energy to commercial and industrial customers.
South Jersey Energy - SJE is a licensed, deregulated energy supplier.
South Jersey Resources Group - SJRG is a non-regulated, wholesale natural gas marketing company. SJRG provides natural gas commodity, storage, and wholesale and transportation services to more than 83 customers throughout the southern, eastern and mid-western portions of the country, including Fortune 500 companies, energy marketers, natural gas and electric utilities and natural gas producers.
South Jersey Energy Service Plus - Acquired by HomeServe USA

References

External links 
 

Companies listed on the New York Stock Exchange
Energy companies of the United States